David Gervasi (born 1 August 1983 in Poschiavo, Graubünden) is a decathlete from Switzerland. He set his personal best score (7755 points) in the men's decathlon on 1 June 2008 at the 2008 Hypo-Meeting in Götzis. Gervasi is a two-time national champion in the men's decathlon: 2005 and 2006.

Achievements

References

1983 births
Living people
People from Poschiavo
Swiss decathletes
Sportspeople from Graubünden